Ruth Feldman (1911 Liverpool, Ohio – January 11, 2003) was an American poet and translator.

Life
Her father died when she was young and her mother when she was just 17.  She lived with her brother, Milton, who was attending Harvard Law School, while attending Wellesley College.

She lived half the year in her condo overlooking the Charles River; the other half she lived in the Hotel de la Ville, Rome at the top of the Spanish Steps.

She is the author of five books of poetry and fifteen books of Italian translations, all poetry except Primo Levi's concentration camp stories.

Her poetry has been translated into Italian, French, and Spanish.  Her work appeared in AGNI, and New York Review of Books.

Awards
 1999 Feldman and John P. Welle Raiziss/de Palchi Book Prize
 John Florio Prize in England
 Circe-Sabaudia in Italy
 Italo Calvino Prize in the United States
 Literary Translator's Fellowship from the National Endowment for the Arts.
 Raymond E. Baldwin Award

Work

Poetry

Translations

Editor

References

1911 births
2003 deaths
People from East Liverpool, Ohio
Italian–English translators
Wellesley College alumni
American women poets
20th-century American poets
20th-century American women writers
20th-century American translators
21st-century American women